Taqha-ye Jafar Qoli (also Romanized as Ţāqhā-ye Ja‘far Qolī and Ţāqā Ja‘far Qolī; also known as Bard Bedūl) is a village in Qaleh-ye Khvajeh Rural District, in the Central District of Andika County, Khuzestan Province, Iran. At the 2006 census, its population was 33, in 5 families.

References 

Populated places in Andika County